The Waihopai River—the more northerly of two New Zealand rivers of that name—runs through the South Island's Marlborough Region and is a major tributary of the Wairau River. It runs in a generally northeastward direction for all of its length, the first section of which is through narrow alpine valleys. After joining its major tributary, the Spray River, the valley begins to widen, becoming a broad valley by the time the second main tributary, the Avon River is reached.

Rivers of the Marlborough Region
Rivers of New Zealand